Thomas F. Boerwinkle (August 23, 1945 – March 26, 2013) was an American National Basketball Association (NBA) center who spent his entire career with the Chicago Bulls.

Early life
Tom Boerwinkle was born in Independence, Ohio, one of three children of John and Katherine Boerwinkle. John Boerwinkle, an engineer for an oil refinery, was a native of Cleveland and the son of Dutch immigrants who had come to the United States in 1890.

He attended high school at Millersburg Military Institute, a now-defunct prep school in Millersburg, Kentucky later known as Forest Hill Military Academy.

College career
Boerwinkle played for the University of Tennessee and helped the team win the 1967 Southeastern Conference championship. The next year, he was named a Helms Foundation first-team all-American.

In his junior and senior seasons, he averaged a double-double each season—10.2 points and 12.2 rebounds his junior season and 11.3 points and 15.2 rebounds his senior season.

Professional career
Boerwinkle was drafted as the fourth pick of the 1968 NBA draft and played with the Bulls until 1978.  Although largely unappreciated during his playing days, Boerwinkle was a very efficient player, using his brawny seven-foot frame to grab rebounds and set picks while teammates like Jerry Sloan, Chet Walker and Bob Love did most of the scoring.

In addition, Boerwinkle contributed with his passing skills, averaging 3.2 assists per game during his career. Acting as a distribution hub from the center position, he helped set a precedent for future passing big men such as two-time NBA MVP Nikola Jokić. On January 8, 1970, Boerwinkle set a Bulls record by grabbing 37 rebounds against the Phoenix Suns. He retired with career totals of 4,596 points, 5,745 rebounds, and 2,007 assists. Boerwinkle also had five triple doubles in his career.

Later life
Boerwinkle later served as a radio color analyst for the Bulls. He was a longtime co-owner of the Olympic Oil Co. in Stickney, Illinois.

Boerwinkle died on March 26, 2013 in Willowbrook, Illinois after struggling with myelodysplastic syndrome, a form of leukemia.

Upon his death, longtime Bulls teammate Bob Love said, "He was a great teammate with a heart of gold. And I always tell people: Half of my baskets came from him. He's one of the best-passing big men of all-time." Hall of Fame center and Bulls teammate Artis Gilmore said, "He understood his role extremely well. He had a very big body and he absorbed a lot of space. With those behind-the-back and over-the-head passes, he was very good. He understood the game and he played intelligent basketball."

He was survived by his wife of 41 years, Linda, son Jeff and daughter Gretchen.

Career statistics

NBA

Regular season
{| class="wikitable sortable" style="text-align:right;"
|+NBA regular season playing statistics
!scope="col"|Year
!scope="col"|Team
!scope="col"|GP
!scope="col"|MPG
!scope="col"|FG%
!scope="col"|FT%
!scope="col"|RPG
!scope="col"|APG
!scope="col"|SPG
!scope="col"|BPG
!scope="col"|PPG
|-
!scope="row" style="text-align:left;"| 
| style="text-align:left;"| Chicago
| 80 || 29.6 || .383 || .653 || 11.1 || 2.2 || – || – || 9.8
|-
!scope="row" style="text-align:left;"| 
| style="text-align:left;"| Chicago
| 81 || 28.8 || .449 ||.664 || 12.5 || 2.8 || – || – || 10.4
|-
!scope="row" style="text-align:left;"|
| style="text-align:left;"| Chicago
| 82 || 28.9 || .485 ||  .724 || 13.8 || 4.8 || – || – || 10.8
|-
!scope="row" style="text-align:left;"| 
| style="text-align:left;"| Chicago
| 80 || 25.3 || .438 || .656 || 11.2 || 3.5 || – || – || 7.0
|-
!scope="row" style="text-align:left;"|
| style="text-align:left;"| Chicago
| 8 || 22.0 || .375 || .600 || 6.8 || 5.0 || – || – || 3.8
|-
!scope="row" style="text-align:left;"| 
| style="text-align:left;"| Chicago
| 46 || 13.1 || .487 || .700 || 4.6 || 2.0 || .3 || .4 || 3.4
|-
!scope="row" style="text-align:left;"| 
| style="text-align:left;"| Chicago
| 80 || 14.7 || .487 || .768 || 4.8 || 3.4 || .4 || .6 || 4.2
|-
!scope="row" style="text-align:left;"| 
| style="text-align:left;"| Chicago
| 74 || 27.6 || .500 || .667 || 10.7 || 3.8 || .6 || .7 || 8.8
|-
!scope="row" style="text-align:left;"| 
| style="text-align:left;"| Chicago
| 82 || 13.0 || .491 || .540 || 3.8 || 2.3 || .2 || .2 || 3.7
|-
!scope="row" style="text-align:left;"| 
| style="text-align:left;"| Chicago
| 22 || 10.3 || .460 || .769 || 2.7 || 2.0 || .1 || .2 || 2.5
|- class="sortbottom"
!scope="row" style="text-align:center;" colspan=2| Career
| 635 || 22.7 || .453 || .675 || 9.0 || 3.2 || .4 || .5 || 7.2

Playoffs

{| class="wikitable sortable" style="text-align:right;"
|+NBA playoff playing statistics
!scope="col"|Year
!scope="col"|Team
!scope="col"|GP
!scope="col"|MPG
!scope="col"|FG%
!scope="col"|FT%
!scope="col"|RPG
!scope="col"|APG
!scope="col"|SPG
!scope="col"|BPG
!scope="col"|PPG
|-
!scope="row" style="text-align:left;"| 1970
| style="text-align:left;"| Chicago
| 5 || 35.4 || .506 || .615 || 14.4 || 3.2 || – || – || 17.6
|-
!scope="row" style="text-align:left;"|1971
| style="text-align:left;"| Chicago
| 7 || 24.1 || .463 || .714 || 9.6 || 4.4 || – || – || 6.1
|-
!scope="row" style="text-align:left;"| 1972
| style="text-align:left;"| Chicago
| 1 || 8.0 || .000 || – || 6.0 || 3.0 || – || – || .0
|-
!scope="row" style="text-align:left;"| 1973
| style="text-align:left;"| Chicago
| 4 || 7.5 || .667 || 1.000 || 2.3 || 2.8 || – || – || 2.3
|-
!scope="row" style="text-align:left;"| 1974
| style="text-align:left;"| Chicago
| 2 || 3.5 || .000 || 1.000 || .5 || .0 || .0 || .0 || 1.0
|-
!scope="row" style="text-align:left;"| 1975
| style="text-align:left;"| Chicago
| 13 || 29.0 || .439 || .800 || 12.7 || 4.2 || .3 || .8 || 8.2
|-
!scope="row" style="text-align:left;"| 1977
| style="text-align:left;"| Chicago
| 3 || 5.7 || .200 || – || 3.3 || 2.3 || .0 || .3 || .7
|- class="sortbottom"
!scope="row" style="text-align:center;" colspan=2| Career
| 35 || 22.4 || .459 || .750 || 9.4 || 3.5 || .2 || .6 || 7.1

See also 
 List of NBA players who have spent their entire career with one franchise

Notes

External links

1945 births
2013 deaths
American men's basketball players
American people of Dutch descent
Basketball players from Cleveland
Centers (basketball)
Chicago Bulls announcers
Chicago Bulls draft picks
Chicago Bulls players
Deaths from myelodysplastic syndrome
People from Independence, Ohio
Tennessee Volunteers basketball players